Yazid ibn Ziyad ibn Muhasir, known as Abu l-Shaʿtha al-Kindi, was in the army of Umar ibn Sa'd at first but then he joined the army of Hussain ibn Ali. He was martyred in the Battle of Karbala.

Lineage 
Yazid ibn Ziyad ibn Muhasir was from the Kinda tribe from the Banu Bahdala clan. His kunya was Abu l-Sha'tha.

Companion of Hussain ibn Ali 
When Ibn Ziyad sent a letter to Hurr ibn Yazid, Abu l-Sha'tha recognized the person who delivered the letter since they were from the same tribe, and so he told him: “May your mother sit in mourning for you! What is the message that you delivered?”

He replied: “I obeyed my imam (leader, that is, Ibn Ziyad) and stayed loyal to my allegiance to him”.

Abu l-Sha'tha said: “You have disobeyed God and obeyed your imam to your own destruction and you have gained shame and fire.”
He left Kufa before Hurr ibn Yazid and his army approached the caravan of Hussain, and then joined him.

According to another account, he accompanied the army of Umar ibn Sa'd from Kufa to Karbala. But when he found that Hussain ibn Ali's proposals were rejected, he joined the army of Hussain.

On the day of Ashura 
He fought while riding his horse. When his horse was slaughtered, he squatted near Hussain and threw 100 arrows to the army of Umar ibn Sa'd. After throwing each of the arrows he sang paeans.

When Abu l-Sha'tha' ran out of arrows, he stood up and said: “Only five arrows did not hit the targets”.

He fought until he was martyred.

References 

Husayn ibn Ali
Hussainiya

600s births
680 deaths
People killed at the Battle of Karbala
Year of birth uncertain